Võru Parish is a rural municipality of Estonia, in Võru County. It has a population of 4,770 (as of 1 January 2009) and an area of 202.23 km².

See also
Tsiatsungõlmaa training area

Religion

References

External links